Olga Gennadyevna Kuznetsova (née Klochneva; born 17 November 1968 in Samara, Russian SSR, Soviet Union) is a Russian sport shooter, specializing in the pistols event. She won the gold medal at the 1996 Olympic Games in the 10 metre air pistol event. She competed at three Olympic Games: 1996, 2000 and 2004.

Olympic results

External links
Profile on issfnews.com

1968 births
Living people
Sportspeople from Samara, Russia
Soviet female sport shooters
Russian female sport shooters
ISSF pistol shooters
Olympic shooters of Russia
Shooters at the 1996 Summer Olympics
Shooters at the 2000 Summer Olympics
Shooters at the 2004 Summer Olympics
Olympic gold medalists for Russia
Olympic medalists in shooting
Medalists at the 1996 Summer Olympics
European Games competitors for Russia
Shooters at the 2015 European Games